Vuohijärvi is a lake in Southern Finland. It is located on the border between the regions of Southern Savonia and Kymenlaakso, with the majority of the lake lying in Kymenlaakso. It is quite deep in comparison with other lakes in the region, with a maximum depth of  making it the 7th deepest lake in Finland. The ecological condition of the lake is good and the water is very clear. There are approximately 90 islands, the largest being Kinansaari.

History
Vuohijärvi has a long tradition of Timber rafting.

See also
List of lakes in Finland

References
 Vuohijärvi in Järviwiki Web Service 

Lakes of Kouvola
Lakes of Mäntyharju